A pacemaker or pacesetter, sometimes informally called a rabbit, is a runner who leads a middle- or long-distance running event for the first section to ensure a fast time and avoid excessive tactical racing.  Pacemakers are frequently employed by race organisers for world record attempts with specific instructions for lap times.  Some athletes have essentially become professional pacemakers.  A competitor who chooses the tactic of leading in order to win is called a front-runner rather than a pacemaker.

Pacemakers may be used to avoid the tactics of deception that are possible in competition by those who, for example, race away from the start line (and are likely to subsequently slow down), giving the other runners the impression that they are far behind.  A trusted team of pacemakers who are paid to keep the runners at a speed that they can manage for the rest of the race become useful in such a situation.  Pacemakers are also used on world record attempts in order to make sure that the runner knows where their invisible 'opponent' predecessor is at that stage of the race.  Pacemakers serve the role of conveying tangible information about pacing on the track during a race. Pacemakers may also facilitate drafting.

History

Pacemaking gained much usage after Chris Brasher and Chris Chataway successfully paced Roger Bannister to break the four-minute mile for the first time in 1954.

Purists argue that employing pacemakers detracts from the competitive nature of racing.  Original rules frowned on a competitor who was not actively trying to win, and pacemakers were required to finish a race for any record to count.  This rule has now been dropped, though the pacemaker must still start with the other athletes in the race as a registered entrant.  A lapped competitor may not act as a pacemaker.

Ben Jipcho acted as a pacemaker for Kenyan teammate Kipchoge Keino in the 1968 Olympic men's 1500 m, allowing Keino's sustained speed to build up enough of a lead to counteract rival Jim Ryun's fast kick finish. Whereas most pacemakers are shorter-distance runners assisting in a longer-distance record attempt, Jipcho's favoured events were longer than 1500 m, and there was no prospect of breaking a record. 

The 1500 metres at the Bislett Games in 1981 became part of track folklore when star athletes including Steve Ovett chose not to follow pacemaker Tom Byers but race among themselves.  Ovett's last lap was almost 10 seconds faster than Byers's, but Byers held on to win by a few metres. A similar case occurred in the 1994 Los Angeles Marathon when veteran marathoner Paul Pilkington was paid to set a fast pace then drop out.  When the elite athletes failed to follow his pace, he kept going, ultimately winning $27,000 and a new Mercedes to the surprise of the expected favourites. That year, the L.A. Marathon was the National Championship race, so he also became the United States National Champion.  Brazilian Vanderlei De Lima, later the marathon bronze medalist in the 2004 Summer Olympics, was a pacemaker at the Reims Marathon in 1994. It was his first competitive marathon, and he was supposed to be a pacemaker up to the 21 km point, but won the race.

During the Berlin Marathon in 2000, Simon Biwott was hired as a pacemaker, but crossed the finish line as the winner.

The rules for pacemakers state, three of them at most are dedicated to one group of runners.

In the 2003 Berlin Marathon, Paul Tergat (Kenya) set a new world record with 2:04:55. In the run, the pacemaker Sammy Korir finished 1 second behind in second place. At 21.5 miles into the run, Korir tried to make a move on Tergat which came out unsuccessfully.

Pacemakers are also used in horse racing, where in "classic" distance races (over one mile, or eight furlongs) horses who are better at sprint distances (roughly 5- furlongs) may be entered into major races specifically to set the pace for the top horses from the same stable.  On a few occasions, pacemakers have finished ahead of the horses they were setting the pace for, such as when Summoner won the 2001 Queen Elizabeth II Stakes, and At First Sight running second in the 2010 Epsom Derby ahead of his two more-favoured stablemates.

See also
Domestique
Pacing strategies in track and field

References

External links

 The Story of Tom Byers - The Pacemaker That Beat The Best - Biography on Youtube

Running
Sport of athletics terminology